Libert H. Boeynaems, formally Libert Hubert John Louis Boeynaems, SS.CC., (August 18, 1857 – May 13, 1926), was the fourth vicar apostolic of the Vicariate Apostolic of the Hawaiian Islands — now the Roman Catholic Diocese of Honolulu.

He was born in Antwerp, Belgium, the son of John and Leopoldina (Van Opstal) Boeynaems.  He was educated at the Jesuit college of Antwerp and the Seminary at Mechelen and finished his scholasticate at the University of Leuven.  Boeynaems was ordained to the priesthood as a member of the Congregation of the Sacred Hearts of Jesus and Mary on September 11, 1881.
 

As part of his missionary work, Boeynaems sailed to the Kingdom of Hawai‘i arriving in Honolulu on November 29, 1881, to become a pastor (in January 1882) to the fledgeling Catholic community of native Hawaiians on the island of Kaua‘i in the district encompassing Līhu‘e to Hanalei.  He later ministered to those on Kaua‘i in the district encompassing Līhu‘e to Mana.  During his first few years in Honolulu, Boeynaems was a witness to the 1893 overthrow of the Hawaiian monarchy, proclamation of the Republic of Hawai‘i and establishment of the United States Territory of Hawai‘i.  In 1895 he was transferred to Wailuku, Maui.  

In December, 1902, the Holy See appointed him Pro-Vicar.  On April 8, 1903, he was appointed Vicar Apostolic and was subsequently consecrated titular Bishop of Zeugma in Syria by Archbishop Montgomery in Saint Mary's Cathedral in San Francisco on July 25, 1903. On April 11, 1915, Msgr. Boeynaems consecrated Saint Agnes-in-the-Palms at Kaka‘ako, a former Protestant church at the intersection of Kawaiahao and Kamani streets in Honolulu, to serve the growing population of Portuguese and native Hawaiians in the Kaka‘ako district.  After his death, he was buried at the Honolulu Catholic Cemetery in downtown Honolulu near Thomas Square at the intersection of Ward Avenue and King Street.

References

Belgian emigrants to the United States
Apostolic vicars of the Hawaiian Islands
Picpus Fathers
20th-century Roman Catholic bishops in the United States
Roman Catholic missionaries in Hawaii
1857 births
1926 deaths
Clergy from Antwerp
KU Leuven alumni
Belgian Roman Catholic missionaries
Burials at Honolulu Catholic Cemetery
Contributors to the Catholic Encyclopedia